A. J. Richardson (born June 2, 1995) is an American football wide receiver for the Michigan Panthers of the United States Football League (USFL). He played college football at Boise State and was signed by the Cardinals as an undrafted free agent in 2019.

Early life
Richardson was born June 2, 1995, in Lomita, California and played football at Narbonne High School. During his high school career, as a senior, Richardson totaled 60 receptions for 1,000 yards and 18 TDs and rushed 22 times for 121 yards and four TD and was named a Semper Fidelis All-American, named to All-Marine League, all-city section and All-State teams.

College career
Richardson attended Boise State and played 53 games where he starting 22, he finished his career with 99 receptions for 1,474 yards and 11 TDs, his senior season being his best with 54 receptions for 825 yards and 8 TDs while playing in all 13 games.

Professional career

Arizona Cardinals
After going undrafted in the 2019 NFL Draft, Richardson signed with the Arizona Cardinals. On August 31, Richardson was waived during final roster cuts and was later re-signed to the practice squad, but released a day later. On September 30, Richardson was re-signed following an injury to Johnnie Dixon. On December 30, Richardson signed a futures contract with the Cardinals.

On September 5, 2020, Richardson was waived during final roster cuts, and re-signed to the practice squad a day later. He was placed on the practice squad/injured list on December 22, 2020, and signed a reserve/future contract after the season on January 5, 2021. He was waived on August 30, 2021.

Michigan Panthers
On October 22, 2022, Richardson signed with the Michigan Panthers of the United States Football League (USFL).

References

External links
Boise State Broncos football bio
Arizona Cardinals bio

1995 births
Living people
Arizona Cardinals players
People from Lomita, California
Players of American football from California
Sportspeople from Los Angeles County, California
Boise State Broncos football players
Michigan Panthers (2022) players